Jan Ejnar Jørgensen (born  19 February 1965 in Frederiksberg) is a Danish politician, who is a member of the Folketing for the Venstre political party. He was elected into parliament in the 2011 Danish general election.

Political career
Jørgensen has been a member of the municipal council of Frederiksberg Municipality since 2010, and been the deputy mayor since 2017.
Jørgensen was first elected into the Folketing at the 2011 election. He was reelected in 2015 Danish general election and 2019. He received 3,254 personal votes in the election in 2015 and 4,597 personal votes in the election in 2019.

References

External links 
 Biography on the website of the Danish Parliament (Folketinget)

1965 births
Living people
People from Frederiksberg
Venstre (Denmark) politicians
Danish municipal councillors
Members of the Folketing 2011–2015
Members of the Folketing 2015–2019
Members of the Folketing 2019–2022
Members of the Folketing 2022–2026